Hans Trittinger (born 30 July 1947) is an Austrian football manager.

References

1947 births
Living people
Austrian football managers
FC Vaduz managers
Austrian expatriate football managers
Expatriate football managers in Switzerland
Austrian expatriate sportspeople in Switzerland